Brushy Creek is a stream in eastern Taney County in the Ozarks of southern Missouri.

The stream intersects Missouri Route 125 just south of Hercules and runs northwest parallel to that road for a short distance before turning west again. West of Hercules the stream flows just to the north of the boundary of Hercules Glades Wilderness and enters Beaver Creek just north of the wilderness area.

History
The stream was named Brushy because of the dense brush along its banks.

References

Rivers of Taney County, Missouri
Rivers of Missouri